The Flemish Ryckaert or Rijckaert family of Antwerp produced several painters during the late sixteenth and the seventeenth centuries.

 David Ryckaert I (1560–1607). Little is known of his career. Two of his sons by his wife Catherine Rem were professional painters.
 David Ryckaert II (1586–1642); eldest son of David I.  He was one of the pioneers of still life painting in Flanders.
 Marten Ryckaert (1587–1631); second son of David I. Anthony van Dyck painted portraits of both brothers, David II and Martin.
 David Ryckaert III (1612–1661); son of David II, grandson of David I, nephew of Martin.  He was a prominent genre painter.

References
 Mcfall, Haldane. A History of Painting. D. D. Nickerson, 1911; reprinted Whitefish, MT, Kessinger Publishing, 2004.
 Van Haute, Bernadette. David III Ryckaert: A Seventeenth-Century Flemish Painter of Peasant Scenes. Turnhout, Brepols, 2000.

17th-century Flemish painters
Artists from Antwerp
Ryckaert